Teochew or Chaozhou (Teochew endonym: ,) is a dialect of Chaoshan Min, a Southern Min language, that is spoken by the Teochew people in the Chaoshan region of eastern Guangdong and by their diaspora around the world. It is sometimes referred to as Chiuchow, its Cantonese rendering, due to the English romanisation by colonial officials and explorers. It is closely related to some dialects of Hokkien, as it shares some cognates and phonology with Hokkien. The two are mutually unintelligible, but it is possible to understand some words.

Teochew preserves many Old Chinese pronunciations and vocabulary that have been lost in some of the other modern varieties of Chinese. As such, Teochew is described as one of the most conservative Chinese languages.

Languages in contact

Mandarin
In China, Teochew children are introduced to Standard Chinese as early as in kindergarten; however, the Teochew language remains the primary medium of instruction. In the early years of primary education, Mandarin becomes the sole language of instruction, but students typically continue to speak to one another in Teochew. Mandarin in widely understood by the Teochew youth, but the elderly may have difficulty with Mandarin due to growing up speaking Teochew.

Chaozhou accent in Mandarin

Native Teochew-speakers find the neutral tone in Mandarin the most difficult tone to master. Teochew has lost the alveolar nasal ending  and so Teochew-speakers often replace it with the velar nasal  when they speak Mandarin. Teochew, like its ancient ancestor, lacks labio-dentals and so its speakers use  or  instead of  when they speak Mandarin.

Hakka
Since Chao'an, Raoping, and Jieyang border the Hakka-speaking region in the north, some people there speak Hakka but they can usually speak Teochew as well. Teochew people have historically had a great deal of contact with the Hakka people, but Hakka has had little, if any, influence on Teochew. Similarly, in Dabu and Fengshun, where the Teochew- and the Hakka-speaking regions meet, Teochew is also spoken, but Hakka remains the primary form of Chinese spoken there.

Cantonese
Because of the strong influence of Hong Kong soap operas, Guangdong provincial television programs and Cantonese pop songs, many young Chaoshan peoples can understand quite a lot of Cantonese even if they cannot speak it with much fluency.

Hmong-Mien languages
In the mountainous area of Fenghuang, the She language, an endangered Hmong–Mien language, is spoken by the She people, who are an officially recognised non-Han ethnic minority. They predominantly speak Hakka (Shehua) and Teochew; only about 1,000 She still speak their eponymous language.

Thai 
The majority of Thai Chinese are Teochew; Teochew is known to have provided a number of loanwords into Thai: .

Khmer (Cambodian) 
The majority of Chinese Cambodians are Teochew; Teochew is known to have provided a number of loanwords into Khmer.

Cambodian Teochew also incorporates a number of loanwords from Khmer, including a function word pi.

Phonetics and phonology

Consonants

Teochew, like other Southern Min varieties, is one of the few modern Sinitic languages which have voiced obstruents (stops, fricatives and affricates); however, unlike Wu and Xiang Chinese, the Teochew voiced stops and fricatives did not evolve from Middle Chinese voiced obstruents, but from nasals. The voiced affricate , initial in such words as 字 (dzi˩), 二 (dzi˧˥), 然 (dziaŋ˥), 若 (dziak˦) loses its affricate property with some younger speakers abroad, and is relaxed to [z].

Southern Min dialects and varieties are typified by a lack of labiodentals, as illustrated below:

Syllables 

Syllables in Teochew contain an onset consonant, a medial glide, a nucleus, usually in the form of a vowel, but can also be occupied by a syllabic consonant like [ŋ], and a final consonant. All the elements of the syllable except for the nucleus are optional, which means a vowel or a syllabic consonant alone can stand as a fully-fledged syllable.

Onsets 

All the consonants except for the glottal stop ʔ shown in the consonants chart above can act as the onset of a syllable; however, the onset position is not obligatorily occupied.

Finals 
Teochew finals consist maximally of a medial, nucleus and coda. The medial can be i or u, the nucleus can be a monophthong or diphthong, and the coda can be a nasal or a stop. A syllable must consist minimally of a vowel nucleus or syllabic nasal.

Tones

Citation tones

Teochew, like other Chinese varieties, is a tonal language. It has a set of eight distinct sounds, but only six of them are considered unique tones. This discrepancy occurs because two of the eight sounds are reduced to stopped syllables, despite already sharing the same pitch as the six main tones. Additionally, depending on the position of a word in a phrase, the tones can change and adopt extensive tone sandhi.

{| class="wikitable" style="text-align:center"
|+Teochew tones
! Tonenumber!!Tone name!!Pitchcontour!!Description!!Sandhi
|-
| 1 || yin level ||  (3) || mid || 1
|-
| 2 || yin rising ||  (52) || falling || 6
|-
| 3 || yin departing ||  (213) || low rising || 2 or 5
|-
| 4 || yin entering ||  (2) || low checked || 8
|-
| 5 || yang level ||  (5) || high || 7
|-
| 6 || yang rising ||  (35) || high rising || 7
|-
| 7 || yang departing ||  (1) || low || 7
|-
| 8 || yang entering ||  (4) || high checked || 4
|}
As with sandhi in other Min Nan dialects, the checked tones interchange. The yang tones all become low. Sandhi is not accounted for in the description below.

Grammar

The grammar of Teochew is similar to other Min languages, as well as some southern varieties of Chinese, especially with Hakka, Yue and Wu. The sequence 'subject–verb–object' is typical, like Standard Mandarin, although the 'subject–object–verb' form is also possible using particles.

Morphology

Pronouns

Personal pronouns 

The personal pronouns in Teochew, like in other Chinese languages, do not show case marking, therefore   means both I and me and   means they and them. The southern Min dialects, like some northern dialects, have a distinction between an inclusive and exclusive we, meaning that when the addressee is being included, the inclusive pronoun   would be used, otherwise   is employed. Outside Southern Min varieties like Teochew, no other southern Chinese variety has this distinction.

Possessive pronouns 

Teochew does not distinguish the possessive pronouns from the possessive adjectives. As a general rule, the possessive pronouns or adjectives are formed by adding the genitive or possessive marker  [kai5] to their respective personal pronouns, as summarised below:

As   is the generic measure word, it may be replaced by other more appropriate classifiers:

Demonstrative pronouns 

Teochew has the typical two-way distinction between the demonstratives, namely the proximals and the distals, as summarised in the following chart:

Interrogative pronouns

Numerals 

Note: (T): Traditional characters; (S): Simplified characters.

Ordinal numbers are formed by adding   in front of a cardinal number.

Voice 

While in Mandarin one can have the agent introducer  or  alone without the agent itself, it is not grammatical to say

 cf. Mandarin )

Instead, we have to say:

Even though this   is unknown.

The agent phrase   always comes immediately after the subject, not at the end of the sentence or between the auxiliary and the past participle like in some European languages (e.g. German, Dutch)

Comparison

Comparative construction with two or more nouns 

Teochew uses the construction "X ADJ   Y", which is believed to have evolved from the Old Chinese "X ADJ  (yú) Y" structure to express the idea of comparison:

Cantonese uses the same construction:

However, due to modern influences from Mandarin, the Mandarin structure "X  Y ADJ" has also gained popularity over the years. Therefore, the same sentence can be re-structured and becomes:

 cf. Mandarin

Comparative construction with only one noun 

The - or -construction must involve two or more nouns to be compared; an ill-formed sentence will be yielded when only one is being mentioned:

 *  (?)

Teochew is different from English, where the second noun being compared can be left out ("Tatyana is more beautiful (than Lisa)". In cases like this, the -construction must be used instead:

The same holds true for Mandarin and Cantonese in that another structure needs to be used when only one of the nouns being compared is mentioned. Teochew and Mandarin both use a pre-modifier (before the adjective) while Cantonese uses a post-modifier (after the adjective).
 Mandarin

 Cantonese

There are two words which are intrinsically comparative in meaning, i.e.  [ĩã5] "better" and  [su1] "worse". They can be used alone or in conjunction with the -structure:

Note the use of the adverbial  [hoʔ2 tsoi7] at the end of the sentence to express a higher degree.

Equal construction 

In Teochew, the idea of equality is expressed with the word  [pẽ5] or  [pẽ5 ĩõ7]:

Superlative construction 

To express the superlative, Teochew uses the adverb  [siaŋ5] or  [siaŋ5 teŋ2].  is usually used with a complimentary connotation.

Vocabulary
The vocabulary of Teochew shares a lot of similarities with Cantonese because of their continuous contact with each other. Like Cantonese, Teochew has a great deal of monosyllabic words. However, ever since the standardisation of Modern Standard Chinese, Teochew has absorbed a lot of Putonghua vocabulary, which is predominantly polysyllabic. Also, Teochew varieties in Singapore, Malaysia and Indonesia have also borrowed extensively from Malay.

Archaic vocabulary
Teochew and other Southern Min varieties, such as Hokkien, preserve a good deal of Old Chinese vocabulary,  such as  [mak] eye (Hokkien: 目 ba̍k),  [ta] dry (Hokkien: 焦 ta), and  [kʰəŋ] hide (cf. ; Hokkien: 囥 khǹg).

Romanisation 

Teochew was romanised by the Provincial Education Department of Guangdong in 1960 to aid linguistic studies and the publication of dictionaries, although Pe̍h-ūe-jī can also be used because Christian missionaries invented it for the transcription of varieties of Southern Min.

Initials 
Initial consonants of Teochew, are represented in the Guangdong Romanization system as: B, BH, C, D, G, GH, H, K, L, M, N, NG, P, R, S, T, and Z.

Examples:
 B  - bag (北 north)
 Bh - bhê (馬 horse)
 C  - cên (青 green), cǔi (嘴 mouth), ciên (槍 gun)
 D  - diê (潮 tide)
 G  - giê (橋 bridge)
 GH  - gho (鵝 goose)
 H  - hung (雲 cloud)
 K  - ke (去 to go)
 L  - lag (六 six)
 M  - mêng (明 bright)
 N  - nang (人 person)
 NG  - ngou (五 five)
 P  - peng (平 peace)
 R  - riêg/ruah (熱 hot)
 S  - sên (生 to be born)
 T  - tin (天 sky)
 Z  - ziu (州 region/state)

Finals

Vowels 

Vowels and vowel combinations in the Teochew dialect include: A, E, Ê, I, O, U, AI, AO, IA, IAO, IO, IU, OI, OU, UA, UAI, UE, and UI.

Examples:
 A - ma (媽 mother)
 E - de (箸 chopsticks)
 Ê - sên (生 to be born)
 I - bhi (味 smell/taste)
 O - to (桃 peach)
 U - ghu (牛 cow)

Many words in Teochew are nasalized. This is represented by the letter "n" in the Guangdong Pengim system.

Example (nasalized):
 suan (山 mountain)
 cên (青 green)

Ending 

Ending consonants in Teochew include M and NG as well as the stops discussed below.

Examples:
 M - iam (鹽 salt)
 NG - bhuang (萬 ten thousand)

Teochew retains many consonant stops lost in Mandarin.  These stops include a labial stop: "b"; velar stop: "g"; and glottal stop: "h".

Examples:
 B - zab (十 ten)
 G - hog (福 happiness)
 H - tih (鐵 iron)

See also

 Southern Min
 Hokkien
 Amoy Hokkien
 Taiwanese Hokkien
 Languages of China
 List of Chinese dialects
 Thai Chinese
 Chinese in Singapore
 Malaysian Chinese
 Indonesian Chinese

References

Sources
 Beijing da xue Zhongguo yu yan wen xue xi yu yan xue jiao yan shi. (2003). Han yu fang yin zi hui. (Chinese dialectal vocabulary) Beijing: Yu wen chu ban she (北京大學中國語言文學系語言學教研室, 2003. 漢語方音字彙. 北京: 語文出版社) 
 Cai Junming. (1991). Putonghua dui zhao Chaozhou fang yan ci hui. (Chaozhou dialectal vocabulary, contrasted with Mandarin) Hong Kong: T. T. Ng Chinese Language Research Centre (蔡俊明, 1991. 普通話對照潮州方言詞彙. 香港: 香港中文大學吳多泰中國語文研究中心) 
 Chappell, Hilary (ed.) (2001). Sinitic grammar : synchronic and diachronic perspectives. Oxford; New York: OUP 
 Chen, Matthew Y. (2000). Tone Sandhi: patterns across Chinese dialects. Cambridge, England: CUP 
 DeFrancis, John. (1984). The Chinese language: fact and fantasy. Honolulu: University of Hawaii Press 
 Li, Xin Kui. (1994). Guangdong di fang yan. (Dialects of Guangdong) Guangzhou, China: Guangdong ren min chu ban she (李新魁, 1994. 廣東的方言. 廣州: 廣東 人民出版社) 
 Li, Yongming. (1959). Chaozhou fang yan. (Chaozhou dialect) Beijing: Zhonghua. (李永明, 1959. 潮州方言. 北京: 中華)
 Lin, Lun Lun. (1997). Xin bian Chaozhou yin zi dian. (New Chaozhou pronunciation dictionary) Shantou, China: Shantou da xue chu ban she. (林倫倫, 1997. 新編潮州音字典. 汕頭: 汕頭大學出版社) 
 Norman, Jerry. [1988] (2002). Chinese. Cambridge, England: CUP 
 Ramsey, S. Robert (1986). Languages of China. Princeton, N.J.: Princeton University Press 
 Xu, Huiling (2007). Aspects of Chaoshan grammar: A synchronic description of the Jieyang dialect. Monograph Series Journal of Chinese Linguistics 22
 Yap, FoongHa; Grunow-Hårsta, Karen; Wrona, Janick  (ed.) (2011). "Nominalization in Asian Languages: Diachronic and typological perspectives". Hong Kong Polytechnic University /Oxford University : John Benjamins Publishing Company

Further reading

  (the New York Public Library) (digitized April 2, 2008)

  (11 Samuel. (Tie-chiu dialect.)) (Harvard University) (digitized December 17, 2007)

External links

1883 American Presbyterian mission press – "A pronouncing and defining dictionary of the Swatow dialect, arranged according to syllables and tones" – by Fielde, Adele Marion (in English)Link to download(3,022 × 4,010 pixels, file size: 42.21 MB, MIME type: image/vnd.djvu, 648 pages)
 Database of Pronunciations of Chinese Dialects (in English, Chinese and Japanese)
 Teochew People - Teochew dialect (in Chinese)
 Glossika - Chinese Languages and Dialects
 Mogher (in Chinese, English and French)
 Omniglot
 Shantou University Chaozhou Studies Resources (in Chinese)
 Teochew Web (in Chinese and English)
 Tonal harmony and register contour in Chaozhou

 
Chaoshan
Teochew culture
Languages of China
Chinese languages in Singapore
Languages of Singapore
Languages of Hong Kong
Languages of Thailand